Wang Jia may refer to:

Wang Jia (Taoist) (died 390), Taoist hermit and scholar during the Sixteen Kingdoms period
Wang Zijia (1622–1657), born Wang Jia, actor during the Ming and Qing dynasties
Wang Jia (director), Chinese film director
Jia Wang, engineer at AT&T Labs Research